The men's 2 miles walk event at the 1938 British Empire Games was held as an invitation event on 7 February at the Sydney Cricket Ground in Sydney, Australia. It was the first time that race walking was held at the Games, although unofficially, and the sport would not return to it until 1966.

Results

References

Athletics at the 1938 British Empire Games
1938